Ilat (Akkar)   (also Eilat) is a  town in Akkar Governorate, Lebanon.

The population of Ilat is mostly Sunni Muslim or Maronite.

History
In 1838, Eli Smith noted  the village as 'Eilat,  located south of esh-Sheikh Mohammed. The  inhabitants were Maronites.

References

Bibliography

External links
Ilat, Localiban 

Populated places in Akkar District
Sunni Muslim communities in Lebanon
Maronite Christian communities in Lebanon